Grazierville is a census-designated place in Snyder Township, Blair County, Pennsylvania, United States.  It is located near I-99 and is approximately one mile to the south of the borough of Tyrone.  As of the 2010 census, the population was 665 residents.

Demographics

References

External links

Census-designated places in Blair County, Pennsylvania
Census-designated places in Pennsylvania